The Allison Islands are a small chain of Antarctic islands lying in the north side of the entrance to Sparkes Bay in the Windmill Islands. They were first mapped from air photos taken by USN Operation Highjump and Operation Windmill in 1947 and 1948. Named by the US-ACAN for William L. Allison, ionospheric scientist and member of the Wilkes Station party of 1958.

See also 
 Composite Antarctic Gazetteer
 List of Antarctic and sub-Antarctic islands
 List of Antarctic islands south of 60° S 
 SCAR
 Territorial claims in Antarctica

References

Windmill Islands